Manshots was an international film review magazine specializing in gay pornography. The magazine included interviews with the directors and actors, original glamour/soft porn photo spreads, video stills, special features on new film reviews, and obituaries. The magazine was printed in the U.S. with (roughly) nine issues per year running from 1988 through to 2001.

The editor of Manshots was Jerry Douglas until March 2001 issue. Then the company of the magazine was sold. The magazine ceased publication with the last issue in June–August 2001—just one issue released after it had been sold.

See also
 List of pornographic magazines

References

Bimonthly magazines published in the United States
Pornographic magazines published in the United States
Film magazines published in the United States
Defunct magazines published in the United States
Gay male pornographic magazines
Magazines established in 1988
Magazines disestablished in 2001
LGBT-related magazines published in the United States